The post-colonial age refers to the period since 1945, when numerous colonies and possessions of major Western countries began to gain independence, in the wake of the end of World War II.

The process of decolonization has occurred all throughout modern history of the Western world; namely any time a colonial possession achieves independence or sovereignty, or some form of greater autonomy, that is a valid occurrence of decolonization; however the period since 1945 is particularly notable, largely due to the breakup of colonial empires held by many major European powers. 

The period following World War I was somewhat parallel, since it involved the breakup of the colonial empires previously held by the nations which were the losing side in that conflict. However,  the period after 1945 was highly notable and arguably unique, since it involved the breakup of colonial possessions of virtually all European powers, including very much the nations who had been the victors in World War II.

Overview by country

Many European countries owned overseas possessions and colonies, all of these gained independence as fully sovereign nations during the decade 

 British Empire. Some of the nations formed after 1945 from former British colonies include: India, Pakistan, Malta, Jamaica, Kenya, and numerous countries within Africa.
France. Algeria was one major country which was previously a French colony.
 Netherlands. Indonesia was a former colony of the Netherlands, which became a country.
Portugal. The Portuguese Colonial War also known in Portugal as the Overseas War, or also known as the Angolan, Guinea-Bissau and Mozambican War of Independence, was a 13-year-long conflict fought between Portugal's military and the emerging nationalist movements in Portugal's African colonies between 1961 and 1974. The war was a decisive ideological struggle in Lusophone Africa, surrounding nations, and mainland Portugal. The former Portuguese territories in Africa became sovereign states, with Agostinho Neto in Angola, Samora Machel in Mozambique, Luís Cabral in Guinea-Bissau, Manuel Pinto da Costa in São Tomé and Príncipe, and Aristides Pereira in Cape Verde as the heads of state. .
United States of America. The Philippines became a full-fledged sovereign nation after World War II. On July 4, 1946, the Philippines was officially recognized by the United States as an independent nation through the Treaty of Manila, during the presidency of Manuel Roxas.

See also

Historical concepts
 Imperialism
Colonialism
Postcolonialism
 Third World
New Imperialism
Neocolonialism

Historical overviews
Wars of national liberation
Decolonization of Africa
Decolonization of Asia
Decolonization of the Americas

Postcolonial movements and concepts
 Inversion in postcolonial theory
 Linguistic imperialism
 Nation-building
 Postcolonial anarchism
 Postcolonial feminism
 Postcolonial theology
 Post-communism
 Cultural hegemony
Neocolonial dependence
Postcolonial theorists
 Paulo Freire

Postcolonial national movements and conflicts
Portuguese Colonial War
 Angolan War of Independence
Guinea-Bissau War of Independence
Mozambican War of Independence

References

Historical eras
Postcolonialism